NordicTrack is an American company that manufactures treadmills, strength training equipment, ellipticals, exercise bikes, and accessories. It is best known for its Nordic ski machines, low-impact exercisers, ellipticals, and incline trainers. NordicTrack is owned and managed by iFIT Health & Fitness Inc. and is headquartered in Logan, Utah. The company has been manufacturing exercise equipment since 1975.

History

Founding: 1970s
NordicTrack was founded by Edward and Florence Pauls in 1975, when Ed Pauls invented the original NordicTrack ski machine in his garage in Chaska, Minnesota, in an effort to train for the local VJC cross-country ski race. Ed Pauls was an engineer, usually got home after dark, and was motivated to beat his Swedish friend in the race.  At the time, the Pauls were making the Flip Ski (a crutch ski used by leg-handicapped downhill skiers) as a part-time mail order business in their basement. Several of their first machines were branded "Nordic Jock", as their original market was anticipated to be college ski racers. The product's name was changed to NordicTrack.

The company was moved to the Jonathan industrial park in Chaska, where it first rented and later built a number of buildings for manufacturing, mail and phone sales, and warehousing. The sales concept was mail-order.

Ads were placed in magazines, including Smithsonian, National Geographic, The New Yorker, and The Wall Street Journal. The ads were different in that they were mostly script explaining the benefits of cardiovascular exercise, and usually a small picture of the machine being used.

The company was built and operated on the cash-and carry basis, and no money was ever borrowed during the Pauls' ownership from 1975 to 1986.

1980s
In the new era of out-sourcing manufacturing (the 1980s), the Pauls family, having a mechanical background, chose to manufacture the machines in-house. From the start, machines were built one at a time on special benches. The company later moved to an assembly line that could put out several thousand units a day. From the start, the woodworking, varnishing, welding, machining, sewing, assembly, packaging, advertising, mailing and sales were all done in-house, mostly by local Chaska residents who were trained by NordicTrack for their specific jobs. As sales grew, more specialized automated procedures were brought in. A UV-varnish conveyor line, full powder coat paint line, robotic welders, two level assembly lines, and a full printing operation and bulk mailing facility were added.

The use of the new VHS video technology was pioneered as a way to show the new buyer during the 30-day trial period how to use this somewhat difficult machine unboxed at home. A NordicTrack ski machine takes the average person some time to learn; like a bicycle, it takes balance and coordination to operate.  The advent of disposable VHS tapes helped to teach and prove to the new owner that this thing worked.  This is why the ski machine has never sold well in stores; people were embarrassed to fumble in public, whereas at home with the video, they mastered it in short order.  The 30-day returns dropped drastically after the video addition.

The NordicTrack was shipped in two boxes and was designed to just squeak under the  UPS weight limit. In 1975 United Parcel Service changed from a limited-destination to a full national and international shipping company. Both companies grew and benefited from the daily truckloads of exercisers rolling out.

Around 1984 Ed and Flo decided that it was time to move on, as they were getting older and managing a new startup takes a whole different personality than managing a name-brand, multi-national corporation.

In 1986 NordicTrack was sold to CML Corporation (CMLK), which moved operations out of Chaska. CML opened retail stores nationally, focused marketing on infomercials, and even began manufacturing other exercise products that were in direct competition of the original NordicTrack. Additionally, CML bought up a number of mom and pop startup companies during the 80s. When competitors emerged and the market became over-saturated, CML (NordicTrack and its subsidiaries) could not sustain the debt incurred from expanding its retail division and marketing operations. Now a bloated multi-national, CML couldn't stay ahead of its spending. It closed its 300+ retail stores, and filed bankruptcy in 1998.

Acquisition
In 1998, Icon Health & Fitness acquired NordicTrack. Since then, NordicTrack has thrived and the company continues to manufacture their classic skier, but this model is declining in popularity. NordicTrack treadmills are the top-selling brand worldwide. They also carry a full line of elliptical trainers and exercise bikes. In 2009, NordicTrack pioneered the incline trainer, a specialty treadmill that can reach an incline of up to 40%. These are some of their most popular machines today.

Recent Developments
In January 2019 at the Consumer Electronics Show in Las Vegas, NordicTrack released a hybrid of a virtual reality gaming product with an stationary bicycle. This system allowed integrated a virtual reality headset with "gaming 8-axis yoke" handlebars to gamify the workout. The propulsion in the game comes from pedaling the bike through various landscapes and sync with gameplay. The NordicTrack VR bike also comes with an iFit connection that automatically adjusts resistance, incline, and decline based upon commands from an online personal trainer.

In late March 2020, the Wall Street Journal reported that NordicTrack saw a dramatic sales spike in NordicTrack fitness equipment due to the coronavirus pandemic stay-at-home policies issued around the world to deal with the crisis.

Awards
In August 2019, the Boy Genius Report picked the NordicTrack T Series treadmill as their "Best Overall" at-home treadmill.

Consumer reports
In 2017, Consumer Reports gave NordicTrack one of their models a Best Buy and three models received a Recommended rating.

Two NordicTrack products received the Consumer Reports Recommended Buy awards, and two NordicTrack treadmills received Best Buy awards in 2016.

Best buy
 NordicTrack C1650 (2017)
 NordicTrack Elite9700 Pro (2016)
 NordicTrack 790 Pro (2016)

Recommended buy
 NordicTrack C970 (2017)
 NordicTrack C990 (2017)
 NordicTrack Sport 7.5 (2017)
 NordicTrack Commercial 1750 (2016)
 NordicTrack C1650 (2016)

See also 
 Bowflex
 Soloflex

References

External links
 NordicTrack.com

Exercise equipment companies
Manufacturing companies based in Minnesota
Manufacturing companies established in 1975
Exercise-related trademarks